Alois Vansteenkiste (7 May 1928 – 27 September 1991) was a Belgian racing cyclist. He won the Belgian national road race title in 1953. He also rode in the 1951 Tour de France.

References

External links

1928 births
1991 deaths
Belgian male cyclists
Sportspeople from Kortrijk
Cyclists from West Flanders